Dimitris Konstantinou (born 8 June 1988) is a Cypriot sport shooter. He competed in the men's skeet event at the 2020 Summer Olympics.

Career
Konstantinou won a silver medal at the 2019 World Shotgun Championships in the skeet team event. A few months later he won another skeet team medal, with Cyprus taking bronze at the 2019 European Shotgun Championships. He also reached the final shoot-off in the individual event, finishing in sixth place and securing his spot at the 2020 Summer Olympics in Tokyo. First-place finisher Jakub Tomeček had already qualified for Tokyo, and three other shooters ahead of Konstantinou came from countries who had already filled their quota places, meaning he and third-place finisher Nikolaos Mavrommatis received them instead.

The 2020 Summer Olympics were delayed due to the COVID-19 pandemic, during which Konstantinou placed second at the 2020 Paphos Skeet Cup. He also achieved an eighth-place finish at the second stage of the 2021 ISSF World Cup in New Delhi, his best-ever result at a World Cup competition. In Tokyo, Konstantinou placed 12th in the men's skeet event with a score of 121, failing to qualify for the final in his Olympic debut.

References

External links
 
 

Living people
1988 births
Cypriot male sport shooters
Skeet shooters
Olympic shooters of Cyprus
Shooters at the 2020 Summer Olympics
People from Paphos